The Stunners  were an American girl group, formed in Los Angeles, California, in 2007. Originally the members were Allie Gonino, Hayley Kiyoko, Marisol Esparza, Kelsey Sanders, and Tinashe. In July 2009 after the debut single "Bubblegum", Sanders left the group and was replaced by Lauren Hudson. The group disbanded in 2011.

Career

2007–09: Beginning and Sanders departure
In 2007, Allie Gonino, Hayley Kiyoko, Kelsey Sanders, Marisol Esparza, and Tinashe became friends and formed the group. Six months later, the group signed with Columbia Records and contributed a song to the iCarly soundtrack. The debut single wasn't released and, in 2009, the group left Columbia and signed a production deal with Lionsgate Entertainment, who also produced a scripted television show pilot based on the group, which was ordered by MTV. On March 18, 2009, they released a single titled "Bubblegum" to iTunes along with the official video for the single. In July 2009, Sanders left the group to pursue her acting career and was substituted by Lauren Hudson.

2010–11: The Stunners and split

On September 29, 2009, the girls released a 5-song EP influenced by Madonna, Gwen Stefani, and Rihanna On December 13, 2009, they appeared on Anything Anything with Rich Russo where they performed an a cappella version of "Santa Bring My Soldier Home". In late December 2009, they released the single "We Got It", with a music video released in February 2010. The group performed the song on The Today Show as well as The Wendy Williams Show. In 2010, they signed to Universal Republic Records and released the single "Dancin' Around the Truth" to iTunes as well as Top 40 radio stations. The music video premiered June 2, just before the group was announced as an opening act on Justin Bieber's My World Tour. They released a holiday single in December 2010, produced by Desmond Child, and written by the five members of the group, titled "Santa Bring My Soldier Home" and encouraged donations the USO for soldiers overseas, not with their families for the holidays.

They had finished their run after twenty dates on the tour and returned to LA to record new songs with producers and writers such as Toby Gad, The Cataracs, Dave Broome, Livvi Franc, Sheppard Soloman, Jimmy Harry and Tony Kanal of No Doubt fame. They shot a fourth music video in the desert of California in November for their new song "Spin The Bottle" which premiered on December 31, 2010. A full album along with an official second single titled "Heart Stops Beating", written by Tinashe and Allie and produced by Orange Factory Music was planned, but cancelled when the group disbanded in 2011.

Members

Discography

Extended play

Singles

Other appearances

Music videos

Concert tours
Opening act
 My World Tour  (2010)

References

External links
Twitter Official
Facebook Official

Musical groups established in 2007
Musical groups disestablished in 2011
American pop music groups
American rhythm and blues musical groups
American pop girl groups
Musical groups from Los Angeles